London Independent School District is a public school district located in Nueces County, Texas (USA).

The district, located in Corpus Christi, Texas, has four campuses; London Elementary, which serves students in grades pre-kindergarten through second grade; London Intermediate, which serves students grades third through fifth grade; London Middle, which serves grades sixth through eighth grade, and London High school, which serves ninth through twelfth grade. The district's high school opened in 2011, and is a 3A school as of the 2020-2021 enrollment year, and serves 1,290 students in grades Pre-K through 12th. LISD contains 98 square miles; with the addition of a new Elementary building, and new Gymnasium wing completed in mid 2020. School mascot is a Pirate.

On July 1, 1991, the Santa Cruz Independent School District merged into London ISD.

In 2009, the school district was rated "exemplary" by the Texas Education Agency.

Schools

London High School (9-12)  
London Middle School (6-8)
London Intermediate School (3-5)
London Elementary School (Pre-K-2)

References

External links
 

School districts in Nueces County, Texas